The Spanish ling (Molva macrophthalma), also called the Mediterranean ling and even blue ling, is a species of fish in the family Lotidae.

Description

Habitat
Spanish ling lives in the northeastern Atlantic Ocean and western Mediterranean; it is common in the Azores.

Behaviour

It feeds on bony fish, squid and lobsters. Known parasites include Lernaeocera copepods.

References

Lotidae
Fish of the North Atlantic
Fish of the Mediterranean Sea
Fish described in 1810
Taxa named by Constantine Samuel Rafinesque